The College of Engineering at Michigan State University (MSU) is made up of 9 departments with 168 faculty members, over 6,000 undergraduate students, 10 undergraduate B.S. degree programs and a wide spectrum of graduate programs in both M.S. and Ph.D. levels. Each department offers at least one degree program, however many include more than one degree, multi-disciplinary programs, certifications and specialties as well as other degree programs affiliated with other colleges at Michigan State University.

Departments
 Applied Engineering Sciences (AES)
 Biomedical Engineering (BME)
 Biosystems and Agricultural Engineering (BAE)
 Chemical Engineering and Materials Science (CHEMS)
 Civil and Environmental Engineering (CEE)
 Computational Mathematics, Science, and Engineering (CMSE)
 Computer Science and Engineering (CSE)
 Electrical and Computer Engineering (ECE)
 Mechanical Engineering (ME)

Undergraduate program
Approximately 6,000 undergraduate students are enrolled and 600-800 Bachelor of Science degrees are awarded annually.

Bachelor's Degrees
 Applied Engineering Sciences
 Biosystems Engineering 
 Chemical Engineering 
 Civil Engineering
 Computer Engineering
 Computer Science
 Electrical Engineering
 Environmental Engineering
 Materials Science and Engineering
 Mechanical Engineering

Multi-Disciplinary Programs
 Biomedical Engineering
 Environmental Engineering

Graduate program
Each year, approximately 800 students are enrolled in advanced degree programs and nearly 200 MS and PhD degrees are awarded. Graduate programs are offered in biosystems engineering, chemical engineering, civil engineering, computer science, computational science, electrical engineering, environmental engineering, materials science, mechanical engineering, and engineering mechanics.

Notable Research
The MSU college of engineering has been accredited with many developments in automotive industry. Recently the college of engineering was in the spotlight for their developments with the new "wave disc generator".

Research centers and facilities
  Automotive Research Experiment Station (ARES)
  BEACON Center for the Study of Evolution in Action, an NSF Science and Technology Center
 Center for Anti-Counterfeiting and Product Protection (A-CAPP)
 Civil Infrastructure Lab
 Composite Materials and Structures Center (CMSC)
 Composite Vehicle Research Center (CVRC)
 Electromagnetics Research Group
 Electron Microscopy Facility
 Energy & Automotive Research Laboratories
 Fraunhofer Center for Coatings and Diamond Technologies (CCD)
 Great Lakes Bio energy Research Center (GLBRC)
 High Performance Computing Center
 MDOT Pavement Research Center of Excellence
 Midwest Hazardous Substance Research Center
 National Center for Pavement Preservation (NCPP)
 NOAA Center of Excellence for Great Lakes and Human Health
 Protein Expression Lab
 Structural Fire Testing Facility
 ZELRI-MSU Power Research Center

The professional or student-run groups and organizations available in the college are listed below.
 American Association of Blacks in Energy (AABE)
 American Institute for Chemical Engineers (AIChE)
 American Society of Agricultural and Biological Engineers (ASABE)
 American Society of Civil Engineers (ASCE)
 American Society of Mechanical Engineers (ASME)
 Association for Computing Machinery (ACM)
 Audio Enthusiasts and Engineers (AEE)
 Biomedical Engineering Society (BMES)
 Biosystems Engineering Student Club
 Chi Epsilon (XE)
 Division of Engineering Computing Services (DECS)
 Engineers Without Borders (EWB)
 Environmental Engineering Student Society(ESS)
 Eta Kappa Nu (ΗΚΝ)
 Formula SAE
 IEEE MSU Student Branch
 International Society of Pharmaceutical Engineering
 Leadership Advantage
 MSE Society
 Michigan State University's Amateur Radio Club (W8SH)
 Michigan State University's Society of Automotive Engineers Baja SAE
 MSU Women in Computing
 National Association of Black Chemists and Chemical Engineers (NOBCCHE)
 National Society of Black Engineers (NSBE)
 National Society of Professional Engineers (NSPE)
 Omega Chi Epsilon
 Pi Tau Sigma
 SAMPE (SAMPE)
 Society of Applied Engineering Sciences (SAES)
 Society of Hispanic Professional Engineers (SHPE)
 Society of Plastics Engineers (SPE)
 Society of Women Engineers
 MSU Solar Car Racing Team
 Student Engineering Council (SEC)
 Tau Beta Pi MSU Chapter
 Triangle Fraternity MSU Chapter
 Upsilon Pi Epsilon

Summer Research Opportunities Program
The Summer Research Opportunities Program, formerly known as the Undergraduate Summer Research Program, is a program run through
the College of Engineering that offers summer research opportunities for high-achieving undergraduate students in an effort to encourage them to consider pursuing graduate degrees and to provide an early opportunity to become involved in research.

References

External links
 MSU College of Engineering
 http://www.egr.msu.edu/spartaneering MSU Spartan Engineers

Michigan State University